A number of ships of the English navy or Royal Navy have borne the name Anne or Ann:

  was a ballinger in service in 1416.
  was a ballinger in service in 1417.
  was a 52-gun  frigate launched as Bridgewater in 1654, and renamed in 1660. She was accidentally blown up in 1673.
 HMY Anne was a royal yacht built in 1661.
  was a 70-gun third-rate ship of the line launched in 1678 and burnt after the Battle of Beachy Head in 1690.
  was a fireship purchased in 1702.
  was a 14-gun armed ship purchased in 1798 and sold in 1802.
  was a seaplane carrier, formerly the German merchant Aenne Rickmers. She was seized in 1914 and renamed in 1915. She became a fleet collier in 1918 and was sold in 1919.

Hired armed vessels

See also
 Ann (ship), a list of ships named Ann or Anne
 
 
 
 
 
 

Royal Navy ship names